Water Usage Effectiveness (WUE) is a sustainability metric created by The Green Grid in 2011 to attempt to measure the amount of water used by datacenters to cool their IT assets.
To calculate simple WUE, a data center manager divides the annual site water usage in liters by the IT equipment energy usage in kilowatt hours (Kwh). Water usage includes water used for cooling, regulating humidity and producing electricity on-site.  More complex WUE calculations are available from The Green Grid website.

References

Benchmarks (computing)
Water conservation